Nyhavn 41 is a listed property overlooking the Nyhavn canal in central Copenhagen, Denmark. It was listed in the Danish registry of protected buildings and places in 1918.

History

18th century

The site was formerly part of a much larger property, comprising all the properties now known as Nyhavn 4149 was part of one large property. This large property was listed in Copenhagen's first cadastre of 1689 as No. 28 in St. Ann's East Quarter. It was owned by tanner Villum Lydersen at that time. It was later divided into a number of smaller properties. The current building on the site was constructed between 1698 and 1699 for Hans Bentsen. It was then a two-storey building. It was heightened with one storey some time between 1731 and 1753. The property was listed in the new cadastre of  1756 as No. 21 it St. Ann's East Quarter. It was owned by Nikolaj Hansen Juul at that time.

No. 21 was home to four households at the 1787 census. Michael Mogensen Black, a merchant, resided in the building with his wife Anna Elisabeth, an employee and a maid. Christian Baden, a timber merchant, resided in the building with his wife Margaretha, the wife's nephew Christian Hemskov	 and a maid. The third household consisted of Hans Kleitrup, his wife Anne Lyngbye, three children from his first marriage (aged 10 to 16), six apprentices (aged 17 to 24) and a maid. The fourth household consisted of Anders Christensen and his wife Giertrud Simons Datter.

19th century
At the time of the 1801 census, No. 21 was home to two households.  Georg Rømer	m a 40-year-old merchant, resided in the building with his wife Sophie Caroline Lanek, their six children (aged four to 17), rqo employees, a maid and a lodger. Cornelia Pass, the widow of a captain named Bagger, resided in the building with her daughter Eva Cornelia Bagger, a 40-year-old manufacturer of sails and compasses named  Stie Thomsen Bang, Bang's 60-year-old father Thomas S. Bang, four sail-maker's apprentices and another maid.

In the new cadastre of 1806, the property was again listed as No. 21. It was by then owned by H. G. Rømer & T. Stolpe.

At the time of the 1834 census, No. 21 was home to four households. Hans Nissen, a ship captain (sjobsfører), resided on the ground floor with his wife Friederickke Petersen, their four children (aged seven to 24), a maid and a lodger (a surgeon). Carl Jacobsen Leth, a skipper, resided on the first floor with his wife Neel Leth and one maid. Stie Bang (aged 73), Tomas Rønne (aged 34) and	Carel Stolp (aged 66)three master sailmakersoccupied the second floor. They lived there with Rønne's wife and three-year-old son, five apprentices and two maids. Bolette Jensen, a 54-year-old widow beer seller (øltapper) resided in the basement with her 15-year-old son, a maid and a lodger.

At the time of the 1840 census, No. 21 was home to 32 people. Andreas Martin Brandt, a merchant, was the new tenant of the first floor apartment. He lived there with his wife Helene Brandt, their two children (aged 13 and 15), 22-year-old Louise Augusta Kroghmeyer	(from Als) and one maid.

The basement  was for many years operated as a hotel under the name Hotel King Edward.

20th century

Simmelhag & Holm, a wholesaler of products from Iceland, Greenland and the Faroe Islands, has also been based in the building. The company was founded by Andreas Simmelhag in 1834 and taken over by his son F. C. Simmelhag (1843-1906) and
C. F. Holm after his death in 1860.  Andreas Wilian Simmelhag, the founder's grandson, became a partner in 1891. The company was still located in the building in 1950.

Building
The building is three storeys tall, five bays wide and has a three-nau gabled wall dormer. A gable stone with a relief of a compass. It was installed in 1761.

Today
Restaurant "Nyhavn 41" is now based in the ground floor.

References

External links

 Nyhavn at indenforvoldene.dk

Listed residential buildings in Copenhagen